African American Architects: A Biographical Dictionary, 1865–1945 is an American biographical dictionary with a focus on the history of previously overlooked African-American architects, the book was edited by Dreck Spurlock Wilson and published in the first edition on January 12, 2004 by Routledge. 

The book features 151 profiles, of which 9 are women. Some of the earliest building designs in this book date back to 1865, however there are possibly earlier African American architects.

African-American women architects

Bibliography

References 

Routledge books
United States biographical dictionaries
Books about African-American history
2004 non-fiction books
African-American architects
American architects